The Belgian Bantam, is a breed of bantam chicken from Belgium. Fourteen colour patterns are recognised in the European standard.

History 

Like the Dutch Bantam and the French Pictave, the Belgian Bantam derives from the widespread European population of small partridge-coloured bantams which in Flemish were known as Engelse kiekskes, "English bantams". From about 1900 these were selectively bred in the area of Liège, in Wallonia. Two distinct bantam breeds were developed, the Belgian Bantam and the Bassette Liégeoise. The Belgian Bantam breed standard was not drawn up until 1934.

The Belgian Bantam is distributed mainly in Flanders, with a few in Wallonia and in the Netherlands. It is rare and at risk of extinction; in 2010 a total of 168 birds were counted in the whole of Belgium.

Characteristics 

The Belgian Bantam is very similar to the Dutch Bantam, but is slightly larger. The comb is single, and the legs are slate-blue.

Fourteen colour patterns are listed in the European standard for the breed, of which thirteen are officially recognised in Belgium. Partridge is the colour most commonly seen; the partridge variant colours are rare, and the other colours extremely rare.

Use 

Belgian Bantam hens are good layers of small white eggs weighing . They are good sitters and good mothers.

References

Bantam chicken breeds
Chicken breeds
Chicken breeds originating in Belgium